The 1996 Vuelta a España was the 51st edition of the Vuelta a España, one of cycling's Grand Tours. The Vuelta began in Valencia on 7 September, and Stage 11 occurred on 18 September with a stage to Salamanca. The race finished in Madrid on 29 September.

Stage 1
7 September 1996 — Valencia to Valencia,

Stage 2
8 September 1996 — Valencia to Cuenca,

Stage 3
9 September 1996 — Cuenca to Albacete,

Stage 4
10 September 1996 — Albacete to Murcia,

Stage 5
11 September 1996 — Murcia to Almería,

Stage 6
12 September 1996 — Almería to Málaga,

Stage 7
13 September 1996 — Málaga to Marbella,

Stage 8
14 September 1996 — Marbella to Jerez de la Frontera,

Stage 9
15 September 1996 — Jerez de la Frontera to Córdoba,

Stage 10
17 September 1996 — El Tiemblo to Ávila,  (ITT)

Stage 11
18 September 1996 — Ávila to Salamanca,

References

1996 Vuelta a España
Vuelta a España stages